Beatriz Costa (born Beatriz da Conceição, 14 December 1907 – 15 April 1996) was a Portuguese actress, the best-known actress of the golden age of Portuguese cinema.  She was the author of several books.

Filmography 
 A Aldeia da Roupa Branca, de Chianca de Garcia (1939);
 O Trevo de Quatro Folhas, de Chianca de Garcia (1936);
 A Canção de Lisboa, de Cottinelli Telmo (1933)
 Minha Noite de Núpcias, de E. W. Emo (1931)
 Lisboa, de J. Leitão de Barros (1930)
 Fátima Milagrosa, de Rino Lupo (1928);
 O Diabo em Lisboa, de Rino Lupo (1926).

Books 
 Sem Papas na Língua (1975)
 Quando os Vascos Eram Santanas… e Não Só (1977)
 Mulheres Sem Fronteiras (1981)
 Nos Cornos da Vida (1984)
 Eles e Eu (1990)
 Saudades do Padeiro (1993)

External links 
 * 

1907 births
1996 deaths
Portuguese film actresses
20th-century Portuguese actresses
People from Mafra, Portugal